Takev Point (‘Takev Nos’ \'ta-kev 'nos\) is the rocky point forming the south extremity of Heros Peninsula on Foyn Coast, Antarctic Peninsula.

The feature is named after Vasiliy Takev, participant in the 1996/97 Bulgarian Antarctic campaign, for his support for the Bulgarian Antarctic programme.

Location
Takev Point is located  4.65 km west-southwest of Spur Point and 8.17 km east-northeast of Varad Point.  British mapping in 1974.

Maps
 British Antarctic Territory: Graham Land.  Scale 1:250000 topographic map.  BAS 250 Series, Sheet SQ 19–20.  London, 1974.
 Antarctic Digital Database (ADD). Scale 1:250000 topographic map of Antarctica. Scientific Committee on Antarctic Research (SCAR). Since 1993, regularly upgraded and updated.

References
 Takev Point. SCAR Composite Antarctic Gazetteer.
 Bulgarian Antarctic Gazetteer. Antarctic Place-names Commission. (details in Bulgarian, basic data in English)

External links
 Takev Point. Copernix satellite image

Headlands of Graham Land
Foyn Coast
Bulgaria and the Antarctic